'Something's Goin' On' is the 32nd studio album by British singer Cliff Richard, released by Decca on 25 October 2004 in the UK. The album reached #7 in the UK Albums Chart and was certified "Gold" by the BPI.

This album was Richard's first with Decca and was recorded in Nashville, Franklin and Miami in the United States. Reviews of the album were positive. Music Week rated this as "Album of the Week as it contained a well-rounded package."
 
Three singles were released from this album, the first being the title song Somethin' Is Goin' On which reached #9 in the UK Singles Chart and stayed for 3 weeks.  
 
The second single release was a song written by Barry Gibb from the Bee Gees called I Cannot Give You My Love which reached #13 in the UK Singles Chart and stayed for 4 weeks. Barry Gibb also appears as a guest on the album as a guitarist and sings backing vocals in the track, his brother Maurice Gibb also featured as keyboardist on the album.
 
The final single release was What Car which reached #12 in the UK Singles Chart and stayed for 3 weeks.  
 
The album has sold over 150,000 copies worldwide.

International release
The album was released as "For Life" on the Edel Records label in 2005 for the European market. It had a revised track-listing including four of the five additional tracks released as B-sides on the singles. These four tracks were recorded during the same series of recording sessions for the rest of the album.

Track listing

B-Sides

Personnel
Cliff Richard - vocals
Barry Gibb - vocals and guitar (on "I Cannot Give You My Love" only)
Maurice Gibb - keyboards
Hal Roland - keyboards
Alan Kendall - guitar
George Perry - bass
Steve Rucker - drums
Gustav Lescano - harmonica
John Merchant - engineer

Charts

References

Cliff Richard albums
2004 albums